George Bishop's Observatory (code: 969) was an astronomical observatory erected in 1836 by the astronomer George Bishop near his residence at the South Villa of Regent's Park, London. It was equipped with a  Dollond refractor.

Description 

The Reverend William Rutter Dawes conducted his noted investigations of double stars at the observatory from 1839 to 1844; John Russell Hind began his career there in October of the following year. From the time that Karl Ludwig Hencke's detection of Astræa, 8 Dec. 1845, showed a prospect of success in the search for new planets, the resources of Bishop's observatory were turned in that direction, and with conspicuous results. Between 1847 and 1854 Hind discovered ten minor planets at the observatory, and Albert Marth one. Other notable astronomers to use the observatory included Eduard Vogel, Charles George Talmage, and Norman Robert Pogson.

The observatory closed when Bishop died in 1861, and in 1863 the instruments and dome were moved to the residence of George Bishop, junior, at Meadowbank, Twickenham, where a new observatory was constructed to follow the same system of work. Twickenham Observatory closed in 1877 and the instruments were given to the Astronomical Observatory of Capodimonte in Italy. Regent's College London now stands on the site of the observatory.

Minor planets discovered 

The following minor planets were discovered at George Bishop's Observatory:

References 

Defunct astronomical observatories
Former buildings and structures in the London Borough of Camden
Former buildings and structures in the City of Westminster